ZNST-FM is an R&B radio station in Nassau, Bahamas.

External links 
 

Radio stations in the Bahamas
Rhythmic contemporary radio stations
Urban contemporary radio stations